Shri Sadguru Gangagir Maharaj Science, Gautam Arts and Sanjeevani Commerce college, Kopargaon, popularly known as S.S.G.M. college, Kopargaon is a degree college in Kopargaon, Maharashtra in Western India. It was founded by Rayat Shikshan Sanstha and is affiliated to Pune University.
The college conducts senior as well as junior degree programs in Arts, Science, Commerce as well as in other areas.
The college has well equipped laboratories, big playground with equipped gymnasium and good library facility with reading hall. It is famous for its chemistry department, which conducts vigorous research in various areas of experimental chemistry. M.Sc. Organic Chemistry, Analytical Chemistry, Physics and Mathematics degrees are given by this college. College is having Ph.D. research center in Chemistry and Commerce.

History
In the late 1950s, the enlightening visit of Padmabhushan Dr. Karmaveer Bhaurao Patil to Kopargaon-Shrirampur, the heavily irrigated area of north Ahmednagar District, initiated the great stalwarts like Shankarraoji Kale to shoulder the responsibility of the noble work and plant the two branches of Rayat Shikshan Sanstha's K.B.P. high school and Kanya Vidya Mandir in 1959 and 1963 respectively. The sense of educational awareness among the populace masses and the creative zeal of Late Swami Sahajanand Bharati, Shankarraoji Kale, Shankarraoji Kolhe, Late Chimanlal Mehta, Late Madhavrao Adhav, Late Mhalusheth Avhad, Prof. Y. N. Kadam, Late. Late Gangadhar Muktaji Gaware (Mama), Late Vishnu Vaze, Shri Panditrao Jadhav and many well wishers sincerely felt the crying need of a college in the Kopargaon town. It was decided to apply to the University of Pune for Rayat Shikshan Sanstha's college from June 1964.
It was but quite natural in the town, another faction thought of a local college instead of Rayat Sanstha's. Revered Swamiji upheld the Rayat Shikshan Sanstha's principles. Two applications reached to University of Pune, the local sanstha succeeded in obtaining permission for Arts & Commerce college. Rayat Shikshan Sanstha's application was turned down for the lack of adequate deposit. But the rayat activists were not discouraged, so efforts were made to get science college from June-1965. It was renamed after Shri Sadguru Gangagiri Maharaj in 1966.

It was manifestation of Karmaveer Bhaurao Patil's speech. For the sake of growth and expansion of the academic front, Arts & Commerce faculties were started from June 1971. The two faculties Arts & Commerce were renamed after the sages Gautam & Sanjivani respectively. Shri Appasaheb Varute was the first principal of the college, who later became the V.C. of Shivaji University, Kolhapur. The young enthusiast Prin. S. D. Patil developed the college with all the aspects qualitatively & quantitatively to flourish it in a huge institute with a number of academic activities.

Campus

The college campus stretches on the spacious area of 22 acres with well-equipped buildings for classrooms, laboratories, library, ladies hostel, 2 boys hostel, computer center, botanic garden, gymnasium hall, playground, basketball court and a volleyball court,kho kho, kabaddi ground, 400m running track.

Commerce colleges in India
Universities and colleges in Maharashtra
Education in Ahmednagar district
Colleges affiliated to Savitribai Phule Pune University